The Hankasalmi railway station is located in the village and urban area of Hankasalmen asemanseutu in the municipality of Hankasalmi, Finland. It is located along the Jyväskylä–Pieksämäki railway, and its neighboring stations are Jyväskylä in the west and Pieksämäki in the east.

The Finnish Heritage Agency has proclaimed the Hankasalmi station a nationally significant built cultural environment.

History 

Work on the Jyväskylä–Pieksämäki railway began in 1913 and it was opened for traffic on 1 June 1918, making Hankasalmi one of its original stations.

Architecture 
The Hankasalmi station was built according to stock blueprints for class V stations on the Jyväskylä–Pieksämäki line, being designed by Thure Hellström. The mansard roof is a distinctive feature of the design that was also used for the Kallislahti station on the Huutokoski–Savonlinna railway. The station building has been well preserved, as have the other buildings on its premises, which include a warehouse as well as two residential buildings.

Service 
Hankasalmi is served by all InterCity and Pendolino trains that use the Jyväskylä–Pieksämäki line as part of their route.

A siding connects the station's rail yard to the Versowood Hankasalmi sawmill. Starting from the 2010s, the frequency of timber shipments to the sawmill by rail has decreased, though as of 2019, the connection is known to be maintained and used on an irregular basis.

External links 
 
 Train departures and arrivals at Hankasalmi on Finrail

References 

Hankasalmi
Railway stations opened in 1918
Railway stations in Central Finland